The 2004 BYU Cougars football team represented Brigham Young University during the 2004 NCAA Division I-A football season.

Schedule

•SportsWest Productions (SWP) games were shown locally on KSL 5.

BYU Cougars Radio Network
The BYU Cougars radio network carried every game on radio using the broadcast trio of Greg Wrubell (pxp), Marc Lyons (analyst), and Bill Riley or Andy Boyce (sidelines). KSL 1160 AM served as the flagship station for BYU Football.

Game summaries

Notre Dame

Stanford

USC

Boise State

Colorado State

UNLV

Wyoming

Air Force

San Diego State

New Mexico

Utah

References

BYU
BYU Cougars football seasons
BYU Cougars football